Orderic Vitalis (16 February 1075 – ) was an English chronicler and Benedictine monk who wrote one of the great contemporary chronicles of 11th- and 12th-century Normandy and Anglo-Norman England. Modern historians view him as a reliable source.

Background
Orderic was born on 16 February 1075 in Atcham, Shropshire, England, the eldest son of a French priest, Odelerius of Orléans, who had entered the service of Roger de Montgomery, 1st Earl of Shrewsbury, and had received from his patron a chapel there. By the late 11th century, clerical marriage was still not uncommon in western Christendom. Orderic was one of the few monks who were of mixed parentage as his mother was of English heritage. When Orderic was five, his parents sent him to an English monk, Siward by name, who kept a school in the Abbey of SS Peter and Paul at Shrewsbury.

At the age of ten, Orderic was entrusted as an oblate to the Abbey of Saint-Evroul in the Duchy of Normandy, which Montgomery had formerly despoiled but, in his later years, was loading with gifts. The parents paid thirty marks for their son's admission; he expresses the conviction that they imposed this exile upon him from an earnest desire for his welfare. Odelerius's respect for the monastic life is attested to by his own entry, a few years later, into a monastery which the earl had founded at his persuasion. Orderic, on the other hand, felt for some time, as he asserts, like Joseph in a strange land. He did not know a word of French when he reached Normandy. His book, though written many years later, shows that he never lost his English cast of mind or his attachment to the country of his birth.

Monastic life
When Orderic reached the legal age for profession as a monk, his monastic superiors gave him the religious name of "Vitalis" (after a member of the legendary Theban Legion of Christian martyrs) because they found a difficulty in pronouncing his unusual baptismal name. In the title of his great chronicle, he prefixes the old to the new name and proudly adds the epithet Angligena ("English-born").

Orderic's cloistered life was uneventful. He became a deacon in 1093, and a priest in 1107. He left his cloister on several occasions, speaking of having visited Croyland, Worcester, Cambrai (1105) and Cluny Abbey (1132). He turned his attention at an early date to literature, and for many years appears to have spent his summers in the scriptorium.

Orderic's first literary efforts were a continuation and revision of William of Jumièges' Gesta normannorum ducum, a broad history of the Normans and their dukes from the founding of Normandy, which Orderic carried forward into the early twelfth century. He also added information about earlier periods from other sources, for example William of Poitiers' Gesta Guillelmi, and included information not found elsewhere. As Orderic used Norman sources but wrote from an English perspective, his account of the Norman Conquest is balanced, he is sympathetic to both sides. This attitude persists in his Historia Ecclesiastica.

At some time between 1110 and 1115, Orderic's superiors ordered him to write the history of Saint-Evroul. The work, the Historia Ecclesiastica (Ecclesiastical History), grew under his hands until it became a general history of his own age. Saint-Evroul was a house of wealth and distinction. War-worn knights chose it as a resting place for their last years. It was constantly entertaining visitors from southern Italy, where it had established new foundations, and from England, where it had extensive possessions. Thus Orderic, though he witnessed no great events, was well-informed about them. Orderic is a vivid narrator; his character sketches are admirable as summaries of current estimates. His narrative is full of digressions that surprise readers who are looking for a strictly chronological ordering of events, but it has been argued that the digressions reflect Orderic's sense of the connections between events (between the foundation of Saint-Evroul and the Norman Conquest of Southern Italy, for example) and his desire to include as much of this monastic colleagues' memories in his History as possible. It would thus be a truly collective work. Orderic relays much invaluable information not provided by more methodical chroniclers. He throws a flood of light upon the manners and ideas of his own age, and he sometimes comments with shrewdness upon the broader aspects and tendencies of history. His narrative breaks off in the middle of 1141, though he added some finishing touches in 1142. He reports that he was then old and infirm (that year he would have reached the age of 67 years); he probably did not long survive the completion of his great work.

The Historia Ecclesiastica
The Historia Ecclesiastica, described as the greatest English social history of the Middle Ages, falls into three sections:

1) Books i and ii give the history of Christianity from the birth of Christ. After 855 this becomes a bare catalogue of popes, ending with the name of Innocent I. These books Orderic added in 1136–1141 as an afterthought to the original scheme.

2) Books iii through vi form a history of Saint-Evroul, the original nucleus of the work. Planned before 1122, they were mainly composed in the years 1123–1131. The fourth and fifth books contain long digressions on the deeds of William the Conqueror in Normandy and England. Before 1067 these are chiefly derived from two extant sources: William of Jumieges' Gesta Normannorum Ducum and William of Poitiers' Gesta Guillelmi. For the years 1067–1071 Orderic follows the lost portion of the Gesta Guillelmi, and is therefore of the first importance. From 1071, he begins to be an independent authority. Notices of political events in this part of his work are far less copious than in the later books.

3) Books vii through xiii relegate ecclesiastical affairs to the background. In this section, after sketching the history of France under the Carolingian and early Capet dynasties, Orderic takes up the events of his own times, starting from about 1082. He has much to say concerning the Empire, the papacy, the Normans in Sicily and Apulia and the First Crusade (for which he follows Fulcher of Chartres and Baudri of Bourgueil, but with notable alterations). But his chief interest is in the histories of the three brothers: Robert Curthose, Duke of Normandy, William Rufus and Henry I of England. He continues his work, in the form of annals, up to the defeat and capture of Stephen of England at Lincoln in 1141.

The historian Marjorie Chibnall states that Orderic used now-lost pancartes (cartularies or collections of charters) of various Norman monastic houses as sources for his historical writings.

Orderic addressed both contemporaries and future generations, intending for his work to be studied by monks and novices learning about the history of the monastery and its benefactors. The work as a whole was not widely read in the Middle Ages, though individual parts of it were popular and circulated.

The Historia Ecclesiastica is usually cited by abbreviation of the author's name rather than the title; that is, either as Ord. Vitalis or Ord. Vit. followed by volume and page numbers.

Notes

Sources

Further reading
 Chibnall, Marjorie (ed. and trans.), The Ecclesiastical History of Orderic Vitalis, 6 volumes (Oxford, 1968–1980) (Oxford Medieval Texts), .
 Chibnall, Marjorie, The World of Orderic Vitalis (Oxford, 1987).
 Hingst, Amanda Jane, The Written World: Past and place in the work of Orderic Vitalis (Notre Dame, Indiana, University of Notre Dame Press, 2009).
 Rozier, Charles C., Daniel Roach, Giles E.M. Gasper and Elisabeth van Houts (eds) Orderic Vitalis: Life, Works and Interpretations (Woodbridge, Boydell Press, 2016).

External links

 
 Latin Chroniclers from the Eleventh to the Thirteenth Centuries: Orderic Vitalis from The Cambridge History of English and American Literature, Volume I, 1907–21.
 (Orderic) The Battle of Bremule excerpts translated by Marjorie Chibnall.
 (Orderic) On Henry I excerpts translated by David Burr.
 (Orderic) The Norman Conquest excerpts translated by Thomas Forester.
 The first written European ghost story appears in book II of the Ecclesiastical History and is transcribed here
 , trans. by Thomas Forester, with an introduction by François Guizot

Benedictine scholars
Benedictine writers
1075 births
1140s deaths
12th-century English historians
English people of French descent
English expatriates in France
English Benedictines
French Benedictines
12th-century French Roman Catholic priests
English chroniclers
Clergy from Shropshire
Burials in Normandy
12th-century Latin writers
Writers from Shropshire